Plethobasus is a genus of freshwater mussels, aquatic bivalve mollusks in the family Unionidae, the river mussels.

Species
Species within the genus Plethobasus include:
 Plethobasus cicatricosus (white warty-back pearly mussel)
 Plethobasus cooperianus (orange-footed pimpleback mussel)
 Plethobasus cyphyus (sheepnose mussel)

References

 
Bivalve genera
Taxonomy articles created by Polbot